Abu Yusaf is a high-level security commander in ISIL. According to an interview conducted with The Washington Post, Abu Yusaf is a nom-de-guerre of a 27-year-old European Islamist who joined ISIS in 2013.

References

Islamic State of Iraq and the Levant members
Living people
Year of birth missing (living people)